Sunset Song is a Scottish novel by Lewis Grassic Gibbon.

Sunset Song may also refer to:

Sunset Song (TV series), a 1971 BBC Scotland miniseries
Sunset Song (film), a 2015 British drama film

See also
 
 "Sunsets" (song)
 Sunset Sons, a British-Australian band